Ulla Plener (born 12 February 1933) is a German historian.

Life

Family provenance and childhood
Ulla Plener was born in Berlin. The Communist Party, of which her parents Kurt and Marie-Luise Plener were both active members, was an early focus of the government of Adolf Hitler drive to create a one party dictatorship.   With their new baby the Pleners had to escape to Copenhagen after  (1905-1980) displeased the authorities with an article he contributed to a Communist Party newspaper in which he explained "how to use sports training as a defence against Nazis" ("... wie man sich sportlich ertüchtigen kann, um gegen Nazis wehrhaft zu sein").  The family was now split up.  Kurt remained, for the time being, in Copenhagen where he worked for the communist "Red Sport International" organisation and campaigned unsuccessfully for the reversal of the 1931 decision to hold the 1936 Olympic Games in Berlin.   Marie-Louise took her daughter to Moscow.   In 1940  (1909-1996) joined the French resistance.   Her six and a half year old daughter and Ulla's younger brother were consigned to a children's home in Ivanovo, a textiles town to the north-east of Moscow.   Children at the nursery came from 34 different countries:  the common feature was that their parents were all "politically active."   Plener later recalled that they were remarkably well informed about Nazi wartime atrocities, partly because some of the children had themselves, with their families, experienced them.   Meals were regular if meagre:  although starvation was widespread in the Soviet Union during the war, the children at the International Red Aid children's home in Ivanovo never starved.

Academic career
It was only some time after the war ended that the family were reunited in Berlin.Between 1951 and 1956 Ulla Plener studied History at a Moscow university.   She received her doctorate ("Promotion A" under the reconfiguration of academic qualifications introduced in East Germany in 1968) in (East) Berlin in 1969 and her habilitation ("Promotion B") in 1975 for work on the history of the Social Democratic Party between 1945 and 1949.   Her dissertation was later published in a shortened version under the title "SPD 1945–1949. Konzeption, Praxis, Ergebnisse".   She became a lecturer and head of research at the "Institute for Researching Imperialism", part of the Party Central Committee's Academy for Social Sciences.

The Soviet occupation zone which, in the region surrounding Berlin, replaced Nazi Germany in 1945, was itself relaunched, in October 1949, as the Soviet sponsored German Democratic Republic.   Further political changes followed rapidly in 1989/90, leading to German reunification, formally in October 1990.   Following reunification Ulla Plener continued with her studies of the Social Democratic movement in Germany during the later 1940s, publishing biographical studies of the trades union leader Theodor Leipart and the postwar SPD and of the party leader Kurt Schumacher.  Closely linked with these was her more theoretical research on the theory and practice of "economic democracy".

Another of her research themes following reunification was the wartime French resistance, producing biographical studies of various German women active in the French resistance and a full biography of one of these: her own mother, Marie-Luise Plener-Huber.

Something that would have been impossible before 1989 was Plener's contribution on the Stalin years in Moscow.  In 1997 she published "Frauenschicksale unter Stalin" ("The fate of women under Stalin") which was followed nine years later by a "Gedenkband über deutsche Opfer des Großen Terrors in der Sowjetunion" ("Memorial volume on German victims of the Great Terror inside the Soviet Union").   Some of the victims whose fates were set out in this volume were people whose disappearance had, hitherto, been unexplained.  The theme of Stalin's purges was one in which Plener had a personal interest.   When she was living in Moscow as a very small child with her mother, her paternal grandparents had also been living as political refugees in the city.   Her law abiding paternal grandfather was arrested and shot in 1937.   Three years later, in 1940, the Soviets returned her grandmother to Nazi Germany following conclusion of the Molotov–Ribbentrop non-aggression Pact.   Other relatives suffered, and Ulla's mother, Marie-Luise Plener herself came under suspicion.

She followed this up in 2009 with a biography of Mirko Beer, supported with photographs and documentation covering his time as a military doctor with the republican fighters during the Spanish Civil War.   Also of interest is her publication in a single volume of previously unknown diaries and letters covering the final years of his life, 1929-1933, written by the so-called "Communist bandit" or "Red Robin Hood", Max Hoelz.

References

1933 births
Living people
People from East Berlin
20th-century German historians
21st-century German historians
Labor historians
German women historians
21st-century German women writers
20th-century German women writers